Hari Anumolu is an Indian cinematographer and director who works in predominantly Telugu-language films. He is best known for his work in Mayuri (1985). Anumolu is known for his stint with working with debutante directors for which he worked with thirty. His work in the film Ganesh (2009) was praised by critics.

Personal life
His son Shekar Chandra works as a music composer in Telugu films.

Filmography

As cinematographer 

 1982 Manchu Pallaki
 1985 Mayuri
 1986 Ladies Tailor
 1986 Swati (Hindi)
 1986 Aalaapana
 1986 Aranyakanda
 1987 America Abbayi
 1988 Maharshi 
 1988 Sri Kanaka Mahalakshmi Recording Dance Troupe
 1988 Varasudochhadu
 1989 Chettu Kinda Pleader 
 1989 Swara Kalpana
 1991 Jaitra Yatra
 1991 Seetharamaiah Gari Manavaralu
 1993 Inspector Jhansi
 1993 Rowdy Mogudu
 1995 Lingababu Love Story
 1995 Real Hero
 1997 Priyaragalu
 1999 Manasulo Maata
 1999 Anaganaga Oka Ammayi
 2000 Nuvve Kavali
 2001 Preminchu
 2001 Student No. 1
 2002 Seshu
 2002 Nuvve Nuvve
 2003 Vijayam
 2003 Ela Cheppanu
 2004 Gowri
 2006 Premante Inte
 2007 Classmates
 2007 Veduka
 2008 Gamyam
 2009 Ganesh Just Ganesh
 2012 Onamalu

As director 
Police Report (1989)

Awards and nominations

References

External links 

Nandi Award winners
Telugu film cinematographers
Telugu film directors
Hindi film cinematographers
Living people
Cinematographers from Andhra Pradesh
20th-century Indian photographers
21st-century Indian photographers
Year of birth missing (living people)